Partido Social Democrático may refer to:

 Social Democratic Party (Brazil, 1945–65)
 Social Democratic Party (Brazil, 1987–2003)
 Social Democratic Party (Brazil, 2011)
 Social Democratic Party (Cape Verde)